Déjà-Vu is a compilation album by Will, released on February 15, 2000 by COP International. It comprises most of the band's previously released output, with the exceptions of the tracks "New Mass" from Pearl of Great Price and "Father Forgive" from Word•Flesh•Stone. The album peaked at #26 on the CMJ RPM Charts in the U.S.

Track listing

Personnel
Adapted from the Déjà-Vu liner notes.

Will
 Rhys Fulber – keyboard, drum programming, production, engineering
 John McRae – vocals, art direction
 Chris Peterson – keyboard, production, engineering
 Jeff Stoddard – electric guitar (1–11)

Production and additional personnel
 Kelly Alm – design
 Michael Balch – engineering, production (1–11)
 John Dennison – photography
 Christian Hell – design
 Gunnar Schreck – cover art

References

External links 
 

2000 compilation albums
Will (band) albums
Albums produced by Rhys Fulber
Albums produced by Chris Peterson (producer)